Juris Podnieks (December 5, 1950, Riga – June 23, 1992, Kuldīga District) was a Latvian film director and producer.

He graduated from the Soviet VGIK film school in 1975 after which he started working at the Riga Film Studio. He became a director in 1979.

Podnieks' first film Cradle won an award at the Dok Leipzig festival. In 1981, his film The Brothers Kokar took the first prize at the Kiev Youth Festival. In the same year, his film Constellation of Riflemen won honours in the 17th All State Festival in Leningrad and the Latvian Komsomol prize. This film gave Podnieks wide recognition within the Soviet Union.

Podnieks gained international recognition with his movie 'Is It Easy to Be Young?. The film with dialogue in both Latvian and Russian was an exploration of Soviet youth, in which Podnieks  talked to youngsters later convicted for criminal actions. The movie broke box-office records in the Soviet Union.

As the Soviet Union collapsed, Podnieks cooperated with British television to give a first-hand insight on the events in the Soviet Union. Over three years, Podnieks filmed a five-part documentary titled Soviets  or Hello, do you hear us? (Mēs? in Latvian). It showed civil unrest in Uzbekistan, survivors of the 1988 Spitak earthquake in Armenia, striking workers in Yaroslavl and former residents returning to Chernobyl etc. The first film in the series, Red Hot, was awarded the Prix Italia and the Peabody Award.

Later, Podnieks filmed movies that focused on the rise of national identity in Latvia, Lithuania and Estonia. His Homeland was an account of folk festivals in these countries when national songs which had been banned by the Soviet regime for 50 years, were sung by massed choirs. While filming a follow-up  in January 1991, Podnieks and his crew came under sniper fire during the attempted coup by Soviet forces in Riga. Podnieks was beaten up, his cameraman and long-time friend Andris Slapiņš was killed and Gvido Zvaigzne, another collaborator and friend of Podnieks, died of injuries. This was captured on video and shown as an addition to Homeland and later as an introduction for the revised version of this film.

Four of his films received the Lielais Kristaps prize as the best documentary of the year.

Juris Podnieks drowned on 23 June 1992 while scuba-diving in Zvirgzdu Lake near Alsunga in Courland.

References

External links
 IMDB profile
Entry on Filmas.lv - Latvian Film Database (in Latvian)
Obituary by Juris Kaza; The Independent 4 July 1992
 "Something For Everyone: Juris Podnieks was the film maker's film maker"; The Independent 4 July 1992
Profile on Latfilma website

1950 births
1992 deaths
Accidental deaths in Latvia
Latvian film directors
Soviet film directors
Deaths by drowning
Gerasimov Institute of Cinematography alumni
Lielais Kristaps Award winners
Film people from Riga